Hossam Habib (born May 31, 1980) is an Egyptian singer and composer.

Personal life 
Habib has one sister (Ranya) and one brother (Bassel) whom are both younger than him.

Hossam got married in Cairo, Egypt, on April 7, 2018, to the Egyptian singer, Sherine Abdel-Wahab. The wedding was only attended by immediate family members and the managers and organizer of the couple, including Sherine's daughters (Maryam and Hana) from previous marriage to composer, Mohammed Mustafa. It was Habib's second marriage. Hossam Habib and Sherine divorced in 2021.

Career 
Hossam initially worked as a composer. He composed Elissa's song "Ayshalak" (Arabic: عايشالك). Hossam loved to sing and compose but he had never attempted to make singing his career. His family and friends convinced him to give it a try and he signed with a production company where he did his first single 'Men Yomak' (Egyptian Arabic: من يومك). Habib launched his first album Lessa with another production company called FAME and his second one with Melody.

After the Arab Spring, Hossam released a new song called 'Aala Sot' (Arabic: أعلى صوت) singing in the memory of the Tunisian revolution and Egyptian Revolution, he presented it to the Egyptian and Arab people.

Discography

Albums 
Fara2 Ketir -(2016)
 Lessa ("Still") – 2004
 Agmal Quesset Hob ("The Most Beautiful Love Story") – 2006
 ''Gowa El Alb ("In the Heart") – 2008

Other songs 
Hossam also sang some songs with many other singers as:
 "Law Konna Benhebbaha" (Arabic: لو كنا بنحبها).
 "Ahsan Nass" (Arabic: أحسن ناس).

Awards

References

External links 

1980 births
Singers from Cairo
Living people
21st-century Egyptian male singers
Singers who perform in Egyptian Arabic